{{DISPLAYTITLE:Fischer group Fi24}}   

In the area of modern algebra known as group theory, the Fischer group Fi24 or F24′ is a sporadic simple group of order
   22131652731113172329
 = 1255205709190661721292800
 ≈ 1.

History and properties
Fi24 is one of the 26 sporadic groups and is the largest of the three Fischer groups introduced by  while investigating 3-transposition groups.  It is the 3rd largest of the sporadic groups (after the Monster group and Baby Monster group).

The outer automorphism group has order 2, and the Schur multiplier has order 3. The automorphism group is a 3-transposition group Fi24, containing the simple group with index 2.

The centralizer of an element of order 3 in the monster group is a triple cover of the sporadic simple group Fi24, as a result of which the prime 3 plays a special role in its theory.

Representations
The centralizer of an element of order 3 in the monster group is a triple cover of the Fischer group, as a result of which the prime 3 plays a special role in its theory. In particular it acts on a vertex operator algebra over the field with 3 elements.

The simple Fischer group has a rank 3 action  on  a graph of 306936 (=23.33.72.29) vertices corresponding to the 3-transpositions of Fi24, with point stabilizer the Fischer group Fi23.

The triple cover has a complex representation of dimension 783. When reduced modulo 3 this has 1-dimensional invariant subspaces and quotient spaces, giving an irreducible representation of dimension 781 over the field with 3 elements.

Generalized Monstrous Moonshine

Conway and Norton suggested in their 1979 paper that monstrous moonshine is not limited to the monster, but that similar phenomena may be found for other groups. Larissa Queen and others subsequently found that one can construct the expansions of many Hauptmoduln from simple combinations of dimensions of sporadic groups.  For Fi24 (as well as Fi23), the relevant McKay-Thompson series is  where one can set the constant term a(0) = 42,

Maximal subgroups
 found the 22 conjugacy classes of maximal subgroups of Fi24 as follows:

 Fi23 Centralizes a 3-transposition in the automorphism group Fi24.
 2.Fi22:2
 (3 x O(3):3):2
 O(2)
 37.O7(3)
 31+10:U5(2):2
 211.M24
 22.U6(2):S3
 21+12:3.U4(3).2
 32+4+8.(A5 x 2A4).2
 (A4 x O(2):3):2
 He:2 (Two classes, fused by an outer automorphism)
 23+12.(L3(2) x A6)
 26+8.(S3 x A8)
 (G2(3) x 32:2).2
 (A9 x A5):2
 A7 x 7:6
 [313]:(L3(3) x 2)
 L2(8):3 x A6
 U3(3):2 (Two classes, fused by an outer automorphism)
 L2(13):2 (Two classes, fused by an outer automorphism)
 29:14

References
 contains a complete proof of Fischer's theorem.
 This is the first part of Fischer's preprint on the construction of his groups. The remainder of the paper is unpublished (as of 2010).

 
Wilson, R. A.  ATLAS of Finite Group Representation.

External links 
 MathWorld: Fischer Groups
 Atlas of Finite Group Representations: Fi24

Sporadic groups